2012 Cambodian League is the 28th season of the Cambodian League. A total of 10 teams are competing in the league.

The regular season was played from March 3 to August 8, 2012 and featured playoffs at the end of the season to determine the league champions, just like in the 2009 and 2010 campaigns to add more excitement to the league. Boeung Ket Rubber Field was the league champion, defeating regular-season winner Nagacorp in he Final Playoffs match.

Teams
 Boeung Ket Rubber Field
 Build Bright United
 Chhlam Samuth
 Kirivong Sok Sen Chey
 Nagacorp FC
 National Defense Ministry
 Phnom Penh Crown
 National Police Commissary
 Preah Khan Reach (aka Royal Sword)
 Western University

Personnel and sponsoring

Venues

League table

Playoffs

Semi-finals

Final

Champions qualify to 2013 AFC President's Cup.

Top scorers

Awards

References

C-League seasons
Cambodia
Cambodia
1